Rolf Örn (5 January 1893 – 4 April 1979) was a Swedish equestrian. He competed in two events at the 1936 Summer Olympics.

References

1893 births
1979 deaths
Swedish male equestrians
Olympic equestrians of Sweden
Equestrians at the 1936 Summer Olympics
Sportspeople from Gothenburg
20th-century Swedish people